Campaigns & Communications Group is an Australian company founded by Bruce Hawker as a specialized election campaign and communications advisory firm in 2011. Hawker was formerly Chairman and co-founder of the government relations and lobbying firm Hawker Britton, established with David Britton in 1997. He is aligned with the Australian Labor Party, and he has worked as a campaign strategist and adviser on more than 30 State, Federal and Australian territory election campaigns.

Bruce Hawker 
Bruce Hawker is a leading political strategist and commentator and chairman of Campaigns and Communications Group. Before this, Hawker was Chief of Staff to former New South Wales Premier Bob Carr MP from 1995 to 1997 and Chief of Staff to Bob Carr MP while he was Leader of the Opposition in NSW from 1989 to 1995.

In 2008, Hawker was named by The Sydney Morning Herald as one of Sydney's most influential people.  In 2010, Australian Prime Minister Julia Gillard described Hawker as a "wise elder" of the Australian Labor Party.
Hawker has a Bachelor of Arts degree from the University of Queensland and a law degree from the University of New South Wales. In 2011, The Sydney Morning Herald nominated Hawker in its "50 most powerful people" as one of the top five political powerbrokers.

In June 2013, Hawker was appointed Prime Minister Kevin Rudd's Political Adviser, a position he held until the Government's defeat in the 2013 Australian federal election in September 2013. Following the election, Melbourne University Publishing published his campaign diaries, The Rudd Rebellion: The Campaign to Save Labor.

Hawker is a regular contributor to the media, writing opinion pieces and editorials for The Sydney Morning Herald and frequently appearing in interviews on Sky News and the Australian Broadcasting Corporation. When it was suggested that he was resigning from Hawker Britton due to the thinning out of state Labor governments, Hawker dismissed these suggestions saying, "We've always worked on the basis that Labor governments will come and Labor governments will go, we've always tried to assist in the election of Labor governments, but we are realistic and pragmatic enough to understand no government lasts forever."

Political Work 
In the Wran-Unsworth Government, Hawker was a senior advisor to Frank Walker, Attorney-General and Minister for Housing from 1982 to 1988. 
From 1988 to 1997, Hawker was Chief of Staff to Bob Carr MP, while Carr was Opposition Leader from 1988 to 1995 and Premier from 1995 to 1997.
While Labor was in Opposition in New South Wales under Carr, Hawker is credited with uncovering many scandals of the Greiner Fahey period including the Community Polling affair, a covert Liberal fundraising operation which funded phoney independent candidates in the 1988 state election. Hawker is also credited with uncovering scandals and controversies involving former Coalition MPs including Wal Murray, Matt Singleton, Phillip Smiles, Tony Packard, Neil Pickard and Barry Morris.
These and other controversies became part of Labor's campaign against the NSW Coalition Government and contributed significantly to Labor winning office in 1995.
In 1997, Hawker and David Britton resigned from their positions as Chief of Staff and Chief of Communications, respectively, to start Hawker Britton. When asked to comment about Hawker's resignation, Bob Carr joked, "After all nine years is a long time to spend in a political office." 
Hawker has had a central role in Labor Party campaigns in all States, the Northern Territory and the Commonwealth, since 1997. Between 1998 and 2007 the Labor Party won every State and Territory election it contested. Hawker was at the centre of a decade of success for Labor in State and Territory elections. Between 1998 and 2007 Labor won every State and Territory election it contested. Hawker has also provided advice on campaigns in Greece and New Zealand.
Columnist Piers Akerman described Hawker's role in this way: "This model, labelled the Hawker Britton approach by some conservatives, was first trialled successfully by the young Bruce Hawker when he was former NSW premier Bob Carr's chief of staff. It has been adopted by Labor in every state and federally since Hawker, and Carr's former senior adviser David Britton, left Carr's office in 1997 to form the eponymous political consultancy". The columnist criticised the approach in these terms: "The Hawker Britton approach is about spin, not substance".
Hawker has been referred to as a stalwart of Labor campaigning and described by former South Australian Premier, Mike Rann as "the greatest political strategist in Australia."
When he was Health Minister, current Federal Opposition Leader Tony Abbott described Hawker and Hawker Britton as "dirty tricks merchants", while former Prime Minister John Howard compared Hawker Britton to Liberal Party strategists Crosby Textor, saying "Hawker Britton would leave them (Crosby Textor) for dead."

Recent political work 
The 2010 Australian federal elections resulted in a hung parliament. Hawker led the negotiations on behalf of Prime Minister Julia Gillard and the Labor Party with independent members of parliament Bob Katter, Tony Windsor and Rob Oakeshott. They negotiated the incumbent Labor government a second term in office.

In its assessment of the process which saw Labor returned to power in 2010, The Age newspaper said Hawker was the official point man during Rob Oakeshott's drafting of reforms to parliamentary process. The Age reported that in the negotiations, Hawker was "an effective behind-the-scenes hub" for Labor. The newspaper also reported that Hawker "has made a professional lifetime of being the man in the room – and his long investment in moving, cajoling, strategising and shaking in professional politics and beyond paid dividends for the ALP in a very dark hour." Hawker's involvement was said to cause "disquiet" amongst Liberal ranks with claims that the independent MPs had been "manipulated by the ALP's strategic mastermind". When agreement was finally struck between Labor and the independents, The Daily Telegraph reported that "Hawker is now being hailed within Labor circles as the man who won Labor back the election."
In February 2012, Hawker backed former Prime Minister Kevin Rudd in his unsuccessful bid for the Labor leadership.

See also 
Hawker Britton
Politics of Australia

References 

Political organisations based in Australia